A yottabyte (YB) is 10008 bytes.

Yottabyte may also refer to:

 Yottabyte, 10248 bytes, also called "yobibyte" (YiB)
 Yottabyte (song), a song by Martin Garrix
 Yottabyte LLC, a data-center company in Michigan